Halkirk is a village in central Alberta, Canada within the County of Paintearth No. 18. Founded in 1912, Halkirk was named after Halkirk, Scotland. With commercial operations beginning on December 1, 2012, Capital Power Corporation operates  Alberta's third largest wind farm (largest until May 2013, when the Blackspring projects reached full operation), with 83 Vestas V90 Wind Turbines in the area totalling 150MW capacity.

Geography 
Halkirk is located in an area surrounded by prairies, farmland, and badlands.

Demographics 

In the 2016 Census of Population conducted by Statistics Canada, the Village of Halkirk recorded a population of 112 living in 55 of its 56 total private dwellings, a  change from its 2011 population of 121.

Economy 
Halkirk is within an agricultural region that yields a cross-section of products. In addition, there are several industrial operations located near Halkirk, including a mining operation, a power generating station, and oilfield support services among others.

Attractions and amenities 
Landmarks within Halkirk include its water tower and grain elevator. The grain elevator, formerly owned by Alberta Wheat Pool and later Agricore, is now owned by a local family.

Recreation facilities within the village include a curling rink, baseball diamonds, camping facilities, and rodeo grounds. The rodeo grounds host the annual Halkirk Bullarama – a rodeo-style bull riding competition.

Other facilities include the Halkirk Community Hall, the Halkirk Senior Centre, and an interdenominational church. The community hall hosts numerous private and public social events throughout the year.

Infrastructure and services

Transportation 
Halkirk is served by several transport companies that travel along Highway 12.

Utilities 
The natural gas system is owned by the Village of Halkirk and is supplied by The Paintearth Gas Co-op. Municipal water is supplied by the Shirley McClellan Regional Water Commission.  The sanitation system is owned and operated by the village. Power is supplied by ATCO Electric.

Health care 
Hospital services are located in nearby Castor. Additional diagnostic services are available in Stettler or Red Deer.

Emergency response 
The Village of Halkirk has a volunteer fire department. Emergency medical service is linked to the Stettler network, and East Central Ambulance dispatches ambulances from both Castor and Stettler as needed.

Community organizations 
Two service clubs in Halkirk include the ELKS Club and the Halkirk Seniors club, both of which host several events throughout the year.

Education 
The Village of Halkirk was home to the Mother Teresa Halkirk Catholic School until 2016. It was decided by the East Central Alberta Catholic Separate School Board in March, 2016 to close the school indefinitely due to a decline in numbers of students.

Notable people 
 Shane Doan - former professional hockey player with the NHL's Arizona Coyotes

See also 
List of communities in Alberta
List of villages in Alberta

References

External links 

1912 establishments in Alberta
County of Paintearth No. 18
Villages in Alberta